The 2014–15 UEFA Women's Champions League qualifying round was played on 9, 11 and 14 August 2014. A total of 32 teams competed in the qualifying round to decide 10 of the 32 places in the knockout phase of the 2014–15 UEFA Women's Champions League.

Draw
The draw was held on 26 June 2014, 14:00 CEST, at UEFA headquarters in Nyon, Switzerland. The 32 teams were allocated into four pots based on their UEFA club coefficients at the beginning of the season. They were drawn into eight groups of four containing one team from each of the four seeding pots, with the restriction that each group must contain one of the eight teams which were pre-selected as hosts.

Below were the 32 teams which participated in the qualifying round (with their 2014 UEFA club coefficients). Teams pre-selected as hosts are marked by (H).

Format
In each group, teams played against each other in a round-robin mini-tournament at the pre-selected hosts. The eight group winners and the two runners-up with the best record against the first and third-placed teams in their group advanced to the round of 32.

Tiebreakers
The teams were ranked according to points (3 points for a win, 1 point for a draw, 0 points for a loss). If two or more teams were equal on points on completion of the group matches, the following criteria were applied in the order given to determine the rankings (regulations Article 14.01):
 Higher number of points obtained in the group matches played among the teams in question;
 Superior goal difference resulting from the group matches played among the teams in question;
 Higher number of goals scored in the group matches played among the teams in question;
 If, after having applied criteria 1 to 4, teams still had an equal ranking, criteria 1 to 3 were reapplied exclusively to the matches between the teams in question to determine their final rankings. If this procedure did not lead to a decision, criteria 5 to 9 applied;
 Superior goal difference in all group matches;
 Higher number of goals scored in group matches;
 If only two teams have the same number of points, and they were tied according to criteria 1 to 6 after having met in the last round of the group, their rankings were determined by a penalty shoot-out (not used if more than two teams had the same number of points, or if their rankings were not relevant for qualification for the next stage).
 Higher club coefficient;
 Drawing of lots.

To determine the two best runners-up from the qualifying round, the results against the teams in fourth place were discarded. The following criteria were applied:
 Higher number of points;
 Superior goal difference;
 Higher number of goals scored;
 Higher club coefficient;
 Lower disciplinary points total based only on yellow and red cards received (red card = 3 points, yellow card = 1 point, expulsion for two yellow cards in one match = 3 points);
 Drawing of lots.

Groups
All times were CEST (UTC+2).

Group 1

Group 2

Group 3

Group 4

Group 5

Group 6

Gintra finished as best runners-up and advanced from a mini-tournament for the first time after nine unsuccessful attempts. Vllaznia were the first Albanian team to win points in the competition.

Group 7

Group 8

Ranking of group runners-up
The two best runners-up also qualified for the round of 32. The match against the fourth-placed team in the group did not count for the purposes of the runners-up table.

Statistics
There were 218 goals in 48 matches in the qualifying round, for an average of 4.54 goals per match.

Top goalscorers

Top assists

References

External links
2014–15 UEFA Women's Champions League

Qualifying round